The British Entomological and Natural History Society or BENHS is a British entomological society. It is based at Dinton Pastures Country Park in Reading.

History

BENHS was founded in 1872 as the South London Entomological and Natural History Society.

Publications

BENHS publishes a quarterly journal, the British Journal of Entomology and Natural History, formally Proceedings and Transactions of the British Entomological and Natural History Society, and Proceedings and Transactions of the South London Entomological and Natural History Society.

BENHS has published a number of books. Among the most well-known are two illustrated identification guides to British flies:
 Stubbs, Alan E. and Steven J. Falk (1983) British Hoverflies, an illustrated identification guide
 Stubbs, Alan E. and Martin Drake (2001) British Soldierflies and their allies

Another title published by BENHS was New British Beetles - species not in Joy's practical handbook by Peter J. Hodge and Richard A. Jones, a companion volume to Norman H. Joy's A Practical Handbook of British Beetles.

Affiliated societies
The following groups are affiliated to BENHS:
 Bees, Wasps and Ants Recording Society
 British Myriapod and Isopod Group
 Dipterists Forum

External links
 Society website

British biology societies
Charities based in Berkshire
Entomological societies
Environmental organisations based in the United Kingdom
Natural history societies
Organizations established in 1872
Organisations based in Berkshire
1872 establishments in the United Kingdom